Montenegro competed at the 2015 World Aquatics Championships in Kazan, Russia from 24 July to 9 August 2015.

Swimming

Montenegrin swimmers have achieved qualifying standards in the following events (up to a maximum of 2 swimmers in each event at the A-standard entry time, and 1 at the B-standard):

Men

Women

Water polo

Men's tournament

Team roster

Dejan Lazović
Draško Brguljan
Vjekoslav Pasković
Uroš Čučković
Darko Brguljan
Aleksandar Radović
Mlađan Janović
Aleksa Ukropina
Aleksandar Ivović
Nikola Murišić
Filip Klikovac
Predrag Jokić
Miloš Šćepanović

Group play

Playoffs

Quarterfinals

5th–8th place semifinals

Fifth place game

References

External links
Vaterpolo i plivački savez Crne Gore 

Nations at the 2015 World Aquatics Championships
2015 in Montenegrin sport
Montenegro at the World Aquatics Championships